Kurt A. Masser is a politician from the U.S. commonwealth of Pennsylvania. A member of the Republican Party, he is a member of the Pennsylvania House of Representatives for the 107th district.   Masser serves as the Majority Caucus Administrator. He sits on the Rules Committee and the Committee on Committees.

He is a former Northumberland County Commissioner.

References

External links

State Representative Kurt Masser official caucus site
Kurt Masser (R) official PA House site

Living people
Republican Party members of the Pennsylvania House of Representatives
1965 births
21st-century American politicians

Northumberland County Commissioners (Pennsylvania)